Hydrocarbon economy is a term referencing the global hydrocarbon industry and its relationship to world markets. Energy used mostly comes from three hydrocarbons: petroleum, coal, and natural gas.  Hydrocarbon economy is often used when talking about possible alternatives like the hydrogen economy.

References

Energy economics
Economics catchphrases
Economy by field